Samantha Inoue Harte (born April 21, 1979) is an American voice actress and founder of an animation studio called Saiko Studios. She is perhaps most recognized for her role as the Chocobo in Final Fantasy: Unlimited, the anime series, and as Kohran Li in Sakura Wars.

Career

Animated works
A Scanner Darkly
Birth – Munga
Blade of the Phantom Master – Bat
Clerks: The Lost Scene
Cosplay Complex – Delmo
Devil Lady – Flame Monster and Remi
Fairy Tail – Kemo–Kemo (Eps. 223–224)
Final Fantasy: Unlimited – Chobi the Chocobo, Crux, Cactuar
Gatchaman – Devil Star #2, Additional Voices (ADV dub)
Happy Lesson – Alice
Lilo & Stitch 2: Stitch Has A Glitch
Magical Witchland – Pipin
Negima! – Tsukuyomi
Pumpkin Scissors – Dieter, Additional Voices
Sakura Wars – Li Kohran
SpikeTV's Fresh Baked Video Games
Soul Hunter – Shinyoh
Steam Detectives – Cat
Trinity Blood – Carly
Wedding Peach – Fortune Faye

Live-action
Teeth (uncredited gore FX artist)
Grindhouse
Sin City
Jesse's Closet
No Pain, No Gain
Homo Erectus
Idiocracy
Elvis & Annabelle
Kabluey
Man of the House
A Scanner Darkly
Office Space

Video games
DC Universe Online – Isis

External links

1979 births
Animators from Virginia
American film actresses
American television actresses
American video game actresses
American voice actresses
Living people
Actresses from Virginia
American women animators
20th-century American actresses
21st-century American actresses